Charles John Drinkwater (25 July 1914 – 8 April 1998) was an English professional footballer who played in the Football League for Aston Villa, Charlton Athletic and Watford as an outside left. He later served Ruislip Manor as player-manager.

Club career

Non-League football (1932–1935) 
Drinkwater began his career at Athenian League club Hampstead in 1932 and failed to make an appearance before moving to Northfleet United in March 1933. He returned to Hampstead shortly afterwards and made his debut for the club in the penultimate game of the 1932–33 season, a 4–1 victory over Uxbridge Town. Drinkwater remained with Hampstead (then renamed Golders Green) for the 1933–34 season and scored his first goal for the club in the opening game of the season, a 2–1 defeat to Walthamstow Avenue. He scored 10 goals in 36 appearances during the campaign and helped the Greens to a third-place finish in the league.

Drinkwater's form earned him a move to Second Division club Brentford as an amateur in June 1934, but he failed to make an appearance for the first team and returned to Golders Green for the start of the 1934–35 season. Drinkwater moved to fellow Athenian League club Walthamstow Avenue before the end of the season.

Football League (1935–1947) 
Drinkwater received another chance at League football when he signed for First Division club Aston Villa as an amateur in August 1935. He signed a professional contract October that year. Drinkwater's professional debut came in a league match versus Chelsea on 16 November 1935. He instantly made a name for himself when he scored within three minutes of the kick-off. The Straits Times reported that Drinkwater "trapped a centre with the coolness of a veteran, steadied himself and drove the ball into the net". After one further appearance, he joined First Division club Charlton Athletic in July 1938, but made just three appearances before being released during the 1939 off-season.

The breakout of the Second World War halted competitive football until 1946, but Drinkwater signed for Watford during the war. His war service took him away from the club, but he re-signed in October 1944 and was an ever-present during the 1945–46 season, when an enlarged FA Cup programme was played. When competitive league play returned, Drinkwater made just one appearance during Watford's 1946–47 Third Division South season and he left Vicarage Road at the end of the campaign.

Return to non-League football (1951–1953) 
After a spell training and coaching Pinner, Drinkwater resumed his playing career in April 1951, when he joined London League club Ruislip Manor as player-manager. He achieved a runners-up finish in the 1952–53 season and left the club in October 1953.

Representative career 
Burns made appearances for touring team Middlesex Wanderers in 1935.

International career 
Drinkwater won one cap for England Juniors in 1935.

Personal life 
During the Second World War, Drinkwater served in the Royal Navy as a Physical Training Instructor. After the war, he worked at Mount Vernon Hospital as a remedial gymnast for 30 years.

Career statistics

References

1914 births
Footballers from Willesden
English footballers
Brentford F.C. players
Middlesex Wanderers A.F.C. players
English Football League players
Hendon F.C. players
Aston Villa F.C. players
Walthamstow Avenue F.C. players
Charlton Athletic F.C. players
Watford F.C. players
Tokyngton Manor F.C. players
Tokyngton Manor F.C. managers
England youth international footballers
1998 deaths
Royal Navy personnel of World War II
Association football outside forwards
Northfleet United F.C. players
English football managers
Royal Navy sailors